Mark Fletcher (born 1 April 1965) is an English former professional footballer who played as a right back.

Career
Born in Barnsley, Fletcher played for Barnsley, Bradford City and Matlock Town.

References

1965 births
Living people
English footballers
Barnsley F.C. players
Bradford City A.F.C. players
Matlock Town F.C. players
English Football League players
Association football fullbacks